Dog Puller is a dog sport created in Chernihiv, Ukraine in August, 2012. It is a relatively new sport in comparison to Agility or Disc Dog, but its popularity is growing. Dog Puller shares various characteristics with Agility or Disc Dog, but its main principle is accessibility. The exercises are deliberately created to let any dogs and people start their training irrespective of their level of fitness, disabilities and dog breed.

This sport is based on the exercises with Puller (stylized all caps) — a dog fitness tool — called Puller Running and Puller Jumping. Today Dog Puller is an international sport. The Second Dog Puller World Championship was held in 2019, gathering 91 participants from 11 different countries.

History 
Dog Puller started as a set of exercises developed for the dog fitness tool PULLER in August 2012. It was created by the owner of COLLAR Company that manufactures PULLER tools, Yuriy Sinitsa, dog trainer and PULLER inventor, Serhiy Shkot and sportswoman and cynologist Varvara Petrenko. The PULLER product consists of rings of different sizes that the dog and the human can grip. The main idea of the meeting was creating a sport, accessible for any dogs and people. Varvara created the rules for such a sport from scratch — from the disciplines to score calculation —  based on the exercises developed by Serhiy. The creators of the sport claim that the rules of it will still be modified and people, who practice Dog Puller as a hobby are welcomed to add "home rules" and discuss them in their local clubs.

After several tests and initial corrections of the rules, the first Dog Puller Championship took place in September, 2012. The first participants didn't have special training beforehand and a lot of them didn't even know the rules often learning on the spot. That's was the main point of the test championship: to learn if people who never heard about Dog Puller are able to quickly understand the rules and participate in the game with their dogs. In the 2017 the quantity of the clubs all over the world allowed to hold World Dog Puller Championship, not only local ones. Until the beginning of 2018 the local Dog Puller Federations were created, the rules were standardized for all of them and, in October 2018, the First World Dog Puller Championship finally took place.

Accessibility 
The techniques can be adjusted according to the needs of the competing dog-human pair. For example, the categories of dogs allow them to compete within the group of similarly physically developed animals: the heavy dogs such as molossus compete with each other and small dogs like chihuahua have their own league. Pups and senior dogs are also competing separately, as the dogs of Drive category (such as border collies and other fast breeds).

The human competitors can also compete despite any possible disabilities they have. For example, the rules allow people to kneel or sit in Puller Jumping discipline. It is convenient not only for the small dog breeds (who can't jump to catch the ring in the hand of a standing person), but also for people on wheelchairs. The rules also note that each person can have their own technique, based on their (and their dog's) abilities and the referees should respect this.

The Dog Puller World Championship-2019 was named an inclusive event: there were one-eyed dog and the owners with diabetes (who also was the youngest participant).

Basic exercises and hobby use 
Dog Puller exercises can be practiced both for everyday training and for the competitions. According to the manufacturer research, 20 minutes of training are equal to 5 miles of running, so Dog Puller exercises can be useful not for sport purpose but when the owners don't have time for enough training with their dogs in a traditional way.

The basic exercises that are offered for hobby use are Running, Jumping, Pulling and Swimming. The video instructions, feedbacks and online community allow people to start training even without access to the local club or federation.

The local championships can include all the four disciplines, but according to the rules of 2020 the dogs will compete in two of them - Running and Jumping - on the Dog Puller World Championship.

Rules and disciplines 

The current version of rules can be found at the Dog Puller Championship-2020 site

Current disciplines that are allowed are Running and Jumping. Springpole is obsolete but still can be used in local championships

Running 
The handler throws PULLER rings and the dog has to successfully catch them and bring back to the human

Jumping 
The handler raises hands with PULLER rings and the dog has to jump and catch them with its teeth

Springpole (obsolete) 
The dog has to handle PULLER and pull it, while the rope is attached to the ring.

Competitions

First Dog Puller World Championship (2018) 

The First Dog Puller World Championship took place in Prague, Czech Republic on the 7th of October, 2018. 70 sportspeople from Ukraine, Portugal, South Korea, Russia, Slovakia, Hungary and Czech Republic participated in it. The dogs were divided into four categories: Mini, Maxi, Drive and Bull (see Categories).

The participants from Ukraine, Czech Republic, Hungary and South Korea became multichampions. Ukrainian team became the ultimate champions

World records 
Margarita German and her border collie Ivy set the world record in Puller Jumping (Drive category). Jan Straka and his border collie Axios set the record in Puller Running (Drive category).

Second Dog Puller World Championship (2019) 
The Second Dog Puller World Championship took place on the 7th-8 September in city of Sopron (Hungary). More than 90 participants from 11 countries registered. The teams of Ukraine, Portugal, South Korea, Russia, Hungary, Belarus, Czech Republic, Slovakia, Canada, Austria and Poland came to participate

The Second Dog Puller World Championship became a public event: there were master-classes for the spectators, canistherapy and physiotherapy zones, child and teen Dog Puller competitions and starter Dog Puller lessons.

The Russian team became ultimate champions. Pairs from Ukraine, Russia, Belarus and Hungary became multichampions

Third Dog Puller World Championship (2020) 
The Third Dog Puller World Championship will take place in Poland

Other competitions and use 
Dog Puller is an official dog sport in many countries of the world and Dog Puller trainings and competitions are held as a part of animal training and canistherapy. The elements of Dog Puller (without competition) are also used for the rehabilitation of wounded soldiers in Ukrainian hospitals

References 

Dog sports